Cicrina is a village in the municipality of Ravno, Bosnia and Herzegovina.

Demographics 
According to the 2013 census, its population was 117.

References

Cities and towns in the Federation of Bosnia and Herzegovina
Populated places in Ravno, Bosnia and Herzegovina